In mathematics, a topological vector space (also called a linear topological space and commonly abbreviated TVS or t.v.s.) is one of the basic structures investigated in functional analysis.
A topological vector space is a vector space that is also a topological space with the property that the vector space operations (vector addition and scalar multiplication) are also continuous functions. Some authors also require that the space is a Hausdorff space (although this article does not). One of the most widely studied categories of TVSs are locally convex topological vector spaces. This article focuses on TVSs that are not necessarily locally convex. Banach spaces, Hilbert spaces and Sobolev spaces are other well-known examples of TVSs.

Many topological vector spaces are spaces of functions, or linear operators acting on topological vector spaces, and the topology is often defined so as to capture a particular notion of convergence of sequences of functions.

In this article, the scalar field of a topological vector space will be assumed to be either the complex numbers  or the real numbers  unless clearly stated otherwise.

Motivation

Normed spaces

Every normed vector space has a natural topological structure: the norm induces a metric and the metric induces a topology.
This is a topological vector space because:
This follows directly from the triangle inequality obeyed by the norm.
This follows from the triangle inequality and homogeneity of the norm.

Thus all Banach spaces and Hilbert spaces are examples of topological vector spaces.

Non-normed spaces

There are topological vector spaces whose topology is not induced by a norm, but are still of interest in analysis. Examples of such spaces are spaces of holomorphic functions on an open domain, spaces of infinitely differentiable functions, the Schwartz spaces, and spaces of test functions and the spaces of distributions on them. These are all examples of Montel spaces. An infinite-dimensional Montel space is never normable. The existence of a norm for a given topological vector space is characterized by Kolmogorov's normability criterion. 

A topological field is a topological vector space over each of its subfields.

Definition

A topological vector space (TVS)  is a vector space over a topological field  (most often the real or complex numbers with their standard topologies) that is endowed with a topology such that vector addition  and scalar multiplication  are continuous functions (where the domains of these functions are endowed with product topologies).

Every topological vector space is also a commutative topological group under addition.

Hausdorff assumption

A topological vector space is said to be  if it is Hausdorff; importantly, "separated" does not mean separable. The topological and linear algebraic structures can be tied together even more closely with additional assumptions, the most common of which are listed below.

Category and morphisms

Equivalently, a TVS-embedding is a linear map that is also a topological embedding.

Equivalently, it is a surjective TVS embedding

Many properties of TVSs that are studied, such as local convexity, metrizability, completeness, and normability, are invariant under TVS isomorphisms.

A necessary condition for a vector topology

A collection  of subsets of a vector space is called  if for every  there exists some  such that 

All of the above conditions are consequently a necessity for a topology to form a vector topology.

Defining topologies using neighborhoods of the origin

In general, the set of all balanced and absorbing subsets of a vector space does not satisfy the conditions of this theorem and does not form a neighborhood basis at the origin for any vector topology.

Defining topologies using strings

  if  for every index 
 Balanced (resp. absorbing, closed, convex, open, symmetric, barrelled, absolutely convex/disked, etc.) if this is true of every 
  if  is summative, absorbing, and balanced.

If is an absorbing disk in a vector space  then the sequence defined by  forms a string beginning with  This is called the natural string of  Moreover, if a vector space  has countable dimension then every string contains an absolutely convex string.

Summative sequences of sets have the particularly nice property that they define non-negative continuous real-valued subadditive functions. These functions can then be used to prove many of the basic properties of topological vector spaces.

A proof of the above theorem is given in the article on metrizable topological vector spaces.

  contains :  if and only if  for every index 
 Set of knots: 
 Kernel: 
 Scalar multiple: 
 Sum: 
 Intersection: 

Notation: Let  be the set of all knots of all strings in 

Defining vector topologies using collections of strings is particularly useful for defining classes of TVSs that are not necessarily locally convex.

If  is the set of all topological strings in a TVS  then  A Hausdorff TVS is metrizable if and only if its topology can be induced by a single topological string.

Topological structure

A vector space is an abelian group with respect to the operation of addition, and in a topological vector space the inverse operation is always continuous (since it is the same as multiplication by ). Hence, every topological vector space is an abelian topological group. Every TVS is completely regular but a TVS need not be normal.

Let  be a topological vector space. Given a subspace  the quotient space  with the usual quotient topology is a Hausdorff topological vector space if and only if  is closed.

Invariance of vector topologies

One of the most used properties of vector topologies is that every vector topology is :
Scalar multiplication by a non-zero scalar is a TVS-isomorphism.

Local notions

A subset  of a vector space  is said to be
 absorbing (in ): if for every  there exists a real  such that  for any scalar  satisfying 
 balanced or circled: if  for every scalar 
 convex: if  for every real 
 a disk or absolutely convex: if  is convex and balanced.
 symmetric: if  or equivalently, if 

Every neighborhood of the origin is an absorbing set and contains an open balanced neighborhood of  so every topological vector space has a local base of absorbing and balanced sets. The origin even has a neighborhood basis consisting of closed balanced neighborhoods of  if the space is locally convex then it also has a neighborhood basis consisting of closed convex balanced neighborhoods of the origin.

Bounded subsets

A subset  of a topological vector space  is bounded if for every neighborhood  of the origin, then  when  is sufficiently large.

The definition of boundedness can be weakened a bit;  is bounded if and only if every countable subset of it is bounded. A set is bounded if and only if each of its subsequences is a bounded set. Also,  is bounded if and only if for every balanced neighborhood  of the origin, there exists  such that  Moreover, when  is locally convex, the boundedness can be characterized by seminorms: the subset  is bounded if and only if every continuous seminorm  is bounded on 

Every totally bounded set is bounded.

Metrizability

A TVS is pseudometrizable if and only if it has a countable neighborhood basis at the origin, or equivalent, if and only if its topology is generated by an F-seminorm. A TVS is metrizable if and only if it is Hausdorff and pseudometrizable.

More strongly: a topological vector space is said to be normable if its topology can be induced by a norm. A topological vector space is normable if and only if it is Hausdorff and has a convex bounded neighborhood of the origin.

Let  be a non-discrete locally compact topological field, for example the real or complex numbers.

Completeness and uniform structure

The canonical uniformity on a TVS  is the unique translation-invariant uniformity that induces the topology  on 

Every TVS is assumed to be endowed with this canonical uniformity, which makes all TVSs into uniform spaces. This allows one to  about related notions such as completeness, uniform convergence, Cauchy nets, and uniform continuity. etc., which are always assumed to be with respect to this uniformity (unless indicated other). This implies that every Hausdorff topological vector space is Tychonoff. A subspace of a TVS is compact if and only if it is complete and totally bounded (for Hausdorff TVSs, a set being totally bounded is equivalent to it being precompact). But if the TVS is not Hausdorff then there exist compact subsets that are not closed. However, the closure of a compact subset of a non-Hausdorff TVS is again compact (so compact subsets are relatively compact).

With respect to this uniformity, a net (or sequence)  is Cauchy if and only if for every neighborhood  of  there exists some index  such that  whenever  and 

Every Cauchy sequence is bounded, although Cauchy nets and Cauchy filters may not be bounded. A topological vector space where every Cauchy sequence converges is called sequentially complete; in general, it may not be complete (in the sense that all Cauchy filters converge).

The vector space operation of addition is uniformly continuous and an open map. Scalar multiplication is Cauchy continuous but in general, it is almost never uniformly continuous. Because of this, every topological vector space can be completed and is thus a dense linear subspace of a complete topological vector space.

 Every TVS has a completion and every Hausdorff TVS has a Hausdorff completion. Every TVS (even those that are Hausdorff and/or complete) has infinitely many non-isomorphic non-Hausdorff completions.
 A compact subset of a TVS (not necessarily Hausdorff) is complete. A complete subset of a Hausdorff TVS is closed.
 If a Cauchy filter in a TVS has an accumulation point  then it converges to 
 If a series  converges in a TVS  then  in

Examples

Finest and coarsest vector topology

Let  be a real or complex vector space.

Trivial topology

The trivial topology or indiscrete topology  is always a TVS topology on any vector space  and it is the coarsest TVS topology possible. An important consequence of this is that the intersection of any collection of TVS topologies on  always contains a TVS topology. Any vector space (including those that are infinite dimensional) endowed with the trivial topology is a compact (and thus locally compact) complete pseudometrizable seminormable locally convex topological vector space. It is Hausdorff if and only if 

Finest vector topology

Every linear map from  into another TVS is necessarily continuous. If  has an uncountable Hamel basis then  is  locally convex and  metrizable.

Cartesian products

A Cartesian product of a family of topological vector spaces, when endowed with the product topology, is a topological vector space. Consider for instance the set  of all functions  where  carries its usual Euclidean topology. This set  is a real vector space (where addition and scalar multiplication are defined pointwise, as usual) that can be identified with (and indeed, is often defined to be) the Cartesian product  which carries the natural product topology.

Finite-dimensional spaces

By F. Riesz's theorem, a Hausdorff topological vector space is finite-dimensional if and only if it is locally compact, which happens if and only if it has a compact neighborhood of the origin.

This finite-dimensional vector space  always has a unique  vector topology, which makes it TVS-isomorphic to  where  is endowed with the usual Euclidean topology (which is the same as the product topology). This Hausdorff vector topology is also the (unique) finest vector topology on    has a unique vector topology if and only if  If  then although  does not have a unique vector topology, it does have a unique  vector topology.

The trivial topology on a vector space is Hausdorff if and only if the vector space has dimension 
 If  then  has two vector topologies: the usual Euclidean topology and the (non-Hausdorff) trivial topology.

 If  then  has  distinct vector topologies:

Non-vector topologies

Discrete and cofinite topologies

Linear maps

A linear operator between two topological vector spaces which is continuous at one point is continuous on the whole domain. Moreover, a linear operator  is continuous if  is bounded (as defined below) for some neighborhood  of the origin.

A hyperplane on a topological vector space  is either dense or closed. A linear functional  on a topological vector space  has either dense or closed kernel. Moreover,  is continuous if and only if its kernel is closed.

Types

Depending on the application additional constraints are usually enforced on the topological structure of the space. In fact, several principal results in functional analysis fail to hold in general for topological vector spaces: the closed graph theorem, the open mapping theorem, and the fact that the dual space of the space separates points in the space.

Below are some common topological vector spaces, roughly in order of increasing "niceness."

 F-spaces are complete topological vector spaces with a translation-invariant metric.  These include  spaces for all 
 Locally convex topological vector spaces: here each point has a local base consisting of convex sets. By a technique known as Minkowski functionals it can be shown that a space is locally convex if and only if its topology can be defined by a family of seminorms. Local convexity is the minimum requirement for "geometrical" arguments like the Hahn–Banach theorem. The  spaces are locally convex (in fact, Banach spaces) for all  but not for 
 Barrelled spaces: locally convex spaces where the Banach–Steinhaus theorem holds.
 Bornological space: a locally convex space where the continuous linear operators to any locally convex space are exactly the bounded linear operators.
 Stereotype space: a locally convex space satisfying a variant of reflexivity condition, where the dual space is endowed with the topology of uniform convergence on totally bounded sets.
 Montel space: a barrelled space where every closed and bounded set is compact
 Fréchet spaces: these are complete locally convex spaces where the topology comes from a translation-invariant metric, or equivalently: from a countable family of seminorms. Many interesting spaces of functions fall into this class --  is a Fréchet space under the seminorms  A locally convex F-space is a Fréchet space.
 LF-spaces are limits of Fréchet spaces. ILH spaces are inverse limits of Hilbert spaces.
 Nuclear spaces: these are locally convex spaces with the property that every bounded map from the nuclear space to an arbitrary Banach space is a nuclear operator.
 Normed spaces and seminormed spaces: locally convex spaces where the topology can be described by a single norm or seminorm. In normed spaces a linear operator is continuous if and only if it is bounded.
 Banach spaces: Complete normed vector spaces. Most of functional analysis is formulated for Banach spaces. This class includes the  spaces with  the space  of functions of bounded variation, and certain spaces of measures.
 Reflexive Banach spaces: Banach spaces naturally isomorphic to their double dual (see below), which ensures that some geometrical arguments can be carried out.
 Hilbert spaces: these have an inner product; even though these spaces may be infinite-dimensional, most geometrical reasoning familiar from finite dimensions can be carried out in them. These include  spaces, the  Sobolev spaces  and Hardy spaces.
As pointed out in the preceding section, for a given finite  there is only one -dimensional topological vector space, up to isomorphism. It follows from this that any finite-dimensional subspace of a TVS is closed. A characterization of finite dimensionality is that a Hausdorff TVS is locally compact if and only if it is finite-dimensional (therefore isomorphic to some Euclidean space).

Dual space

Every topological vector space has a continuous dual space—the set  of all continuous linear functionals, that is, continuous linear maps from the space into the base field  A topology on the dual can be defined to be the coarsest topology such that the dual pairing each point evaluation  is continuous. This turns the dual into a locally convex topological vector space. This topology is called the weak-* topology. This may not be the only natural topology on the dual space; for instance, the dual of a normed space has a natural norm defined on it. However, it is very important in applications because of its compactness properties (see Banach–Alaoglu theorem). Caution: Whenever  is a non-normable locally convex space, then the pairing map  is never continuous, no matter which vector space topology one chooses on  A topological vector space has a non-trivial continuous dual space if and only if it has a proper convex neighborhood of the origin.

Properties

Neighborhoods and open setsProperties of neighborhoods and open setsEvery TVS is connected and locally connected and any connected open subset of a TVS is arcwise connected.

If  is an absorbing disk in a TVS  and if  is the Minkowski functional of  then  where importantly, it was  assumed that  had any topological properties nor that  was continuous (which happens if and only if  is a neighborhood of the origin).

Let  and  be two vector topologies on  Then  if and only if whenever a net  in  converges  in  then  in 

This is no longer guaranteed if the set is not convex (a counter-example exists even in ) or if  is not of the second category in itself.InteriorIf  and  has non-empty interior then 

and

The topological interior of a disk is not empty if and only if this interior contains the origin. 
More generally, if  is a balanced set with non-empty interior  in a TVS  then  will necessarily be balanced; consequently,  will be balanced if and only if it contains the origin.
The conclusion  could be false if  is not also convex; for example, in  the interior of the closed and balanced set  is 

If  is convex and  then  
Explicitly, this means that if  is a convex subset of a TVS  (not necessarily Hausdorff or locally convex),  and  then the open line segment joining  and  belongs to the interior of  that is, 

If  is any balanced neighborhood of the origin in  then  where  is the set of all scalars  such that 

If  belongs to the interior of a convex set  and  then the half-open line segment  and  

Non-Hausdorff spaces and the closure of the origin

Every subset of  also carries the trivial topology and so is itself a compact, and thus also complete, subspace (see footnote for a proof).

If  is compact, then  and this set is compact. Thus the closure of a compact subset of a TVS is compact (said differently, all compact sets are relatively compact), which is not guaranteed for arbitrary non-Hausdorff topological spaces.

For every subset   and consequently, if  is open or closed in  then  (so that this  open  closed subsets  can be described as a "tube" whose vertical side is the vector space ). 
For any subset  of this TVS  the following are equivalent:

  is totally bounded.
  is totally bounded.
  is totally bounded.
 The image if  under the canonical quotient map  is totally bounded.

If  is a vector subspace of a TVS  then  is Hausdorff if and only if  is closed in  
Moreover, the quotient map  is always a closed map onto the (necessarily) Hausdorff TVS.

Moreover, if  is a Hausdorff completion of  then  is a completion of 

Closed and compact setsCompact and totally bounded setsA subset of a TVS is compact if and only if it is complete and totally bounded. Thus, in a complete topological vector space, a closed and totally bounded subset is compact. 
A subset  of a TVS  is totally bounded if and only if  is totally bounded, if and only if its image under the canonical quotient map  is totally bounded.

Every relatively compact set is totally bounded and the closure of a totally bounded set is totally bounded. 
The image of a totally bounded set under a uniformly continuous map (such as a continuous linear map for instance) is totally bounded. 
If  is a subset of a TVS  such that every sequence in  has a cluster point in  then  is totally bounded.

In particular, the closure of any convex, balanced, and absorbing subset is a barrel.

The closure of a vector subspace of a TVS is a vector subspace. Every finite dimensional vector subspace of a Hausdorff TVS is closed. 
The sum of a closed vector subspace and a finite-dimensional vector subspace is closed. 
The sum of a compact set and a closed set is closed. However, the sum of two closed subsets may fail to be closed (see this footnote for examples). 

If  and if  is a set of scalars such that neither  contain zero then 

If  then  is convex.

If  then  and so consequently, if  is closed then so is 

If  is a real TVS and  then  where the left hand side is independent of the topology on  moreover, if  is a convex neighborhood of the origin then equality holds.

For any subset   where  is any neighborhood basis at the origin for  
It follows that  for every neighborhood  of the origin in Closed hullsIn a locally convex space, convex hulls of bounded sets are bounded. This is not true for TVSs in general.

 The closed convex hull of a set is equal to the closure of the convex hull of that set; that is, equal to 
 The closed balanced hull of a set is equal to the closure of the balanced hull of that set; that is, equal to 
 The closed disked hull of a set is equal to the closure of the disked hull of that set; that is, equal to 

The balanced hull of a compact (respectively, totally bounded) set has that same property. 
The convex hull of a finite union of compact  sets is again compact and convex.

Other propertiesMeager, nowhere dense, and BaireA disk in a TVS is not nowhere dense if and only if its closure is a neighborhood of the origin. 
A vector subspace of a TVS that is closed but not open is nowhere dense.

Suppose  is a TVS that does not carry the indiscrete topology. Then  is a Baire space if and only if  has no balanced absorbing nowhere dense subset.

A TVS  is a Baire space if and only if  is nonmeager, which happens if and only if there does not exist a nowhere dense set  such that  
Every nonmeager locally convex TVS is a barrelled space.Important algebraic facts and common misconceptionsIf  then ; if  is convex then equality holds. For an example where equality does  hold, let  be non-zero and set   also works.

A subset  is convex if and only if  for all positive real  or equivalently, if and only if  for all 

The convex balanced hull of a set  is equal to the convex hull of the balanced hull of  that is, it is equal to  But in general,  where the inclusion might be strict since the balanced hull of a convex set need not be convex (counter-examples exist even in ).

If  are convex non-empty disjoint sets and  then  or 

In any non-trivial vector space  there exist two disjoint non-empty convex subsets whose union is Other properties'

If  is some unary predicate (a true or false statement dependent on ) then for any   
So for example, if  denotes "" then for any   Similarly, if  is a scalar then  The elements  of these sets must range over a vector space (that is, over ) rather than not just a subset or else these equalities are no longer guaranteed; similarly,  must belong to this vector space (that is).

Properties preserved by set operators

 The balanced hull of a compact (respectively, totally bounded, open) set has that same property.
 The (Minkowski) sum of two compact (respectively, bounded, balanced, convex) sets has that same property. But the sum of two closed sets need  be closed.
 The convex hull of a balanced (resp. open) set is balanced (respectively, open). However, the convex hull of a closed set need  be closed. And the convex hull of a bounded set need  be bounded.

If in every TVS, a property is preserved under the indicated set operator then that cell will be colored green; otherwise, it will be colored red.

So for instance, since the union of two absorbing sets is again absorbing, the cell in row "" and column "Absorbing" is colored green. But since the arbitrary intersection of absorbing sets need not be absorbing, the cell in row "Arbitrary intersections (of at least 1 set)" and column "Absorbing" is colored red. If a cell is not colored then that information has yet to be filled in.

See also

Notes

Proofs

Citations

Bibliography

Further reading

External links

 

Articles containing proofs
Topology of function spaces
Topological spaces
 
Vector spaces